Soslan Totrazovich Dzhanaev (born 13 March 1987) is a Russian professional footballer of Ossetian descent who plays as a goalkeeper for PFC Sochi.

Club career
On 8 January 2019, he was released from his contract with FC Rubin Kazan by mutual consent.

On 27 February 2019, he signed with Polish club Miedź Legnica until the end of the 2018–19 Ekstraklasa season.

On 16 July 2019, he joined Russian Premier League newcomer PFC Sochi. On 20 October 2019 he saved two penalty kicks in a 1–1 away draw against FC Arsenal Tula. He also saved a penalty in the previous game, making it 3 penalty kick saves in 2 games.

International career
In September 2009, Dzhanayev was called up to the Russia national football team for the first time for games against Germany and Azerbaijan. He was called up again in August 2016 for matches against Turkey and Ghana. He made his debut on 9 October 2016 in a friendly against Costa Rica. On 11 May 2018, he was included in Russia's extended 2018 FIFA World Cup squad. He was not included in the finalized World Cup squad. After a 3-year break, he was called up to the national team in August 2019 for the UEFA Euro 2020 qualifying matches against Scotland and Kazakhstan.

Career statistics

Honours

Club
 Spartak Moscow
 Russian Premier League (1): Runner-up  2009

 FC Rostov
 Russian Premier League (1): Runner-up  2015-16

Individual
 Lev Yashin Prize "Goalkeeper of the year": 2015-16
 List of 33 best football player of the Russian Championship: 2015-16

References

1987 births
Living people
Sportspeople from Vladikavkaz
Ossetian people
Ossetian footballers
Association football goalkeepers
Russian footballers
Russia under-21 international footballers
Russia national football B team footballers
Russia international footballers
PFC CSKA Moscow players
FC KAMAZ Naberezhnye Chelny players
FC Spartak Moscow players
FC Akhmat Grozny players
FC Spartak Vladikavkaz players
FC Rostov players
FC Rubin Kazan players
Miedź Legnica players
PFC Sochi players
Russian First League players
Russian Premier League players
Ekstraklasa players
III liga players
Russian expatriate footballers
Expatriate footballers in Poland
Russian expatriate sportspeople in Poland